Bank Job may refer to:

 Bank robbery
 The Bank Job, a 2008 film
 The Bank Job (game show), a 2012 British television programme
 "The Bank Job" (Brooklyn Nine-Nine), a television episode
 Bank Job, a 2009 novel by James Heneghan
 "Bank Job", a song by Barenaked Ladies from Barenaked Ladies Are Me